Evgeniya Rodina was the defending champion.

Seeds

Draw

Finals

Top half

Bottom half

References 
 Main draw
 Qualifying Singles

Ritro Slovak Open - Singles
2010 Women's Singles